Erolcan Çinko (born 15 August 1990) is a Turkish professional basketball player, who plays as a shooting guard and now is free agent.

External links
Erolcan Çinko Euroleague.net Profile
Erolcan Çinko TBLStat.net Profile
Erolcan Çinko Eurobasket Profile
Erolcan Çinko TBL Profile
Erolcan Çinko Twitter

1990 births
Bandırma B.İ.K. players
Galatasaray S.K. (men's basketball) players
Gaziantep Basketbol players
Living people
People from Bandırma
Petkim Spor players
Shooting guards
Tofaş S.K. players
Turkish men's basketball players